Oncopera brachyphylla is a moth of the family Hepialidae. It is found in Queensland, Australia.

The larvae are subterranean and feed on the roots and bases of grasses and leaves in sown pastures.

References

Moths described in 1925
Hepialidae